Häggviks stave church is a replica of a stave church in Häggvik, Nordingrå court district, Norrland province of Sweden.

This replica of a stave church is situated at Anders Åberg's museum Mannaminne at Höga kusten. It was built in 2000.

External links
 Image of Häggviks stave church
 Mannaminne museum

Replicas of stave churches in Sweden
Buildings and structures in Västernorrland County